is a Japanese manga series written and illustrated by Moyashi Fujisawa. It was serialized in Kodansha's josei manga magazine Kiss from March 2017 to April 2021, with its chapters collected into eight tankōbon volumes. A television drama adaptation is set to premiere in 2023 on Netflix.

Media

Manga
Eight tankōbon volumes were published from December 2017 to June 2021.

In June 2022, Kodansha USA announced that they licensed the series for an English digital release.

Volume list

Drama
A television drama adaptation was announced in July 2022, starring Mei Nagano and Kyōka Suzuki. It is directed by Yūichirō Hirakawa, based on a screenplay by Arisa Kaneko. Takeshi Kobayashi is composing the music, with Shin'ichi Takahashi and Kei Haruna serving as producers. The series is set to premiere worldwide on Netflix in 2023.

References

External links
  
 

Drama anime and manga
Japanese television dramas based on manga
Japanese-language Netflix original programming
Josei manga
Kodansha manga
Suspense anime and manga
Upcoming Netflix original programming